Susie Palfreyman (born 11 Feb 1952) is an Australian former rowing coxswain. She was a four-time national champion, a representative at World Championships and a 1980 Olympian.

Club and state rowing
Susie Palfreyman commenced her senior rowing with the University of Western Australia Boat Club. Later she rowed with the Melbourne University Ladies Boat Club.

She first made state selection for Western Australia in 1973. In 1976 and 1977 she coxed West Australian state women's fours contesting the ULVA Trophy at the Interstate Regatta.  By 1978 she had relocated to Victoria and the Melbourne University Boat Club. She coxed Victorian women's crews who won the ULVA Trophy in 1978, 1979, 1980 and 1983.

International representative rowing
Palfreyman was in the stern of the 1979 Australian championVictorian women's four selected to contest the 1979 World Rowing Championships in Bled. They rowed to a fifth place.

That same crew stayed together into the 1980 Olympic year and coached by Susie's husband David Palfreyman they were selected to row Australia's women's four at the 1980 Moscow Olympics. They again finished in fifth place.

Administration
Palfreyman was the inaugural President of the WA Women’s Rowing Association in 1972. She was President of the University of Western Australia Ladies’ Rowing Club from 1973 to 1974 and President of Melbourne University Ladies’ Rowing Club in 1980. Susie was also founding President of the Head of the Schoolgirls, the largest single sex regatta in the southern hemisphere.

References

External links
 

1952 births
Coxswains (rowing)
Living people
Australian female rowers
Olympic rowers of Australia
Rowers at the 1980 Summer Olympics
21st-century Australian women